The importance of corroboration is unique to Scots criminal law. A long-standing feature of Scots law, the requirement for corroborating evidence means at least two independent sources of evidence are required in support of each crucial fact before an accused can be convicted of a crime. This means, for example, that an admission of guilt by the accused is insufficient evidence to convict in Scotland, because that evidence needs to be corroborated by another source.

History
Corroboration had, in some way, already been established by the time the earliest Institutional Writers had begun to illustrate Scots criminal law. MacKenzie described the ‘singularity’ of witnesses, and their ‘contrariety’, as insufficient proof – subsequently repeated by Hume, ‘...no one shall in any case be convicted on the testimony of a single witness’.  A similar statement appears in Alison. 

Corroboration also has origins in Roman law. The Code of Justinian read, ‘We plainly order that the evidence of only one witness shall not be taken’. It has been suggested that at this time, the requirement was based on the distrust of juries – however, it is suggested that it was the mistrust of judges instead, which allowed corroboration to take root.

Following the case of Cadder v HM Advocate in 2010, Lord Carloway was appointed to lead a review of the corroboration rule. In this review, Lord Carloway proposed that the current requirement for corroboration in criminal cases should be abolished.

Corroboration in modern practice

Corroboration is required in Scots law as the evidence of one witness, however credible, is not sufficient to prove a charge against an accused or to establish any material or crucial fact. There are two prime facts that are deemed to be crucial; the first being that the crime was committed and the second being that it was committed by the accused. Crucial facts must be proved beyond reasonable doubt by corroborative evidence.

It is the responsibility of the police to gather all available evidence and disclose it to the Crown. The Crown will decide what evidence will be led and in which court should a trial be required. A common form of corroboration in regards to criminal offences is there are two or more witnesses to an offence. Any witness undertaking an oath in court is accepted as being a 'credible witness and as such, their statement to the court must be taken as truth (although a defence lawyer will attempt to prove this not to be the case through cross examination, undermining their character, pointing out inconsistencies, etc.). If a reporter of an offence makes a statement saying suspect X hit them and there is a witness who makes a statement that they saw this happen, this is corroboration and this is sufficiency of evidence, providing suitable grounds for the suspect to be charged by police and have their status changed to 'accused'.

These can include:
 CCTV – This must show footage relevant to the offence in which the suspect can be identified (usually by police officers or witnesses) – in this instance, it is not the CCTV that is the corroboration, but is it the police or witnesses identifying the suspect on CCTV that are the corroboration;
 Injuries – Again, the injury in and of itself is not sufficient. A medical statement from a trained person such as a doctor stating; "This injury was caused by blunt trauma to the back of the head, within which there are small fragments of glass" is the corroboration, not the injury;
 Forensic evidence – Fingerprints and DNA primarily, with again, the Forensic Scientist identifying those pieces of evidence as belonging to the accused being the corroboration
 Telecomms information – Where an application was submitted and approved to identify the owner of a phone number, it is this information which identifies the phone as belonging to the accused, but again, it is the police officer who corroborates this to be a true document

In instances where there is no direct corroboration, police can still accumulate sufficient indirect or circumstantial evidence to allow a prosecution to be pursued.

Circumstantial evidence can be:
 Motive – Accused was motivated to commit crime through greed, revenge, malice, etc.
 Ability – Accused had the skills or strength etc., necessary to commit crime
 Guilty intent – Accused acted with the intention of committing the crime. For example, a planned armed robbery
 Identification – Forensic evidence, DNA, fingerprints, fibres, etc.
 Conduct after the crime – Evidence that the accused has disposed of incriminating evidence, 'laid low' etc.
 Opportunity – Evidence that the accused was at or near the locus at the time, or had privileged access, etc.
 Preparation – Evidence that the accused purchased a weapon or obtained housebreaking tools in preparation to commit the crime, etc.

Moorov doctrine

The Moorov doctrine is a doctrine that deals with similar fact evidence in Scots law, arising from the case of Moorov v HM Advocate in 1930. The Moorov doctrine can be used where a series of crimes have been committed and are closely linked by time, character, circumstance and place of commission as to constitute a course of conduct by the accused. The accused must be positively identified in each case. There may only be one witness to each individual crime who can identify the accused but where the offences are sufficiently similar the witness for one offence can corroborate the account of a witness for another offence.

Howden doctrine

The Howden doctrine arises from Howden v HM Advocate. The doctrine is used where the accused is charged with two offences but has only been positively identified for one of the offences. The identification can be made by an eyewitness to the offence or other evidence such as forensic evidence. Where the jury is satisfied beyond reasonable doubt that the accused committed one of the offences and the other offence must have been committed by whoever committed the first offence then the accused can be convicted of both offences.

Exceptions

There are some limited exceptions to the requirement for corroboration in criminal cases. Examples include some minor road traffic offences listed under section 21 of the Road Traffic Offenders Act 1988.

See also
 Pre-trial rights of the accused in Scots law
 Corpus delicti
 Criminal procedure
 Evidence (law)
 Legal technicality

References

External links
 Corroboration at Hingston's Law,

Scottish criminal law
Evidence law
Criminal procedure